The Samuel and Minette Kuhn House is a historic house in Wellfleet, Massachusetts. It is one of a modest number of surviving houses in Wellfleet that combine elements of Modern architecture with traditional Cape Cod architecture. The single-story wood-frame house was built in 1960 to a design by Nathaniel Saltonstall, founder of Boston's Institute of Contemporary Art. The Kuhns were exposed to Saltonstall's work when they stayed at The Colony, another property he designed that is located nearby on Griffins Island. The house incorporates Bauhaus design principles of simplicity and economy, and is based around the idea of square modules, which are repeated on small, medium and large scales, affecting the room shapes and sizes, windows, and interior furnishings and decorations. The house, which is within the bounds of the Cape Cod National Seashore, was sold by the Kuhns to the National Park Service in 1973, but they retained right of occupancy for 25 years. The Park Service began using the property for employee housing in 2003.

The house was listed on the National Register of Historic Places in 2014.

See also
National Register of Historic Places listings in Barnstable County, Massachusetts
National Register of Historic Places listings in Cape Cod National Seashore

References

Houses in Barnstable County, Massachusetts
Wellfleet, Massachusetts
Modernist architecture in Massachusetts
National Register of Historic Places in Cape Cod National Seashore
Houses completed in 1960
Houses on the National Register of Historic Places in Barnstable County, Massachusetts